Víctor Manuel Castro Cosío (born 14 June 1955) is a Mexican politician currently affiliated with the National Regeneration Movement. He is the governor of Baja California Sur.

Life

Castro became a teacher and member of the SNTE teachers' union at 19, teaching middle school classes in civic education, history, Spanish and philosophy. Castro also affiliated with the Workers' Revolutionary Party, an early left-wing political party; he sat on its Political State Committee between 1980 and 1984 and on its national central committee between 1986 and 1989.

By 1999, Castro had changed his party affiliation to the Party of the Democratic Revolution, and when it came into power, Castro left teaching to head up a middle school in Baja California Sur. In 2002, he was named the state secretary of public education, a post he would hold for two years. In 2005, he ran successfully for municipal president of La Paz, serving simultaneously on the PRD's state council. After his term as mayor ended, he ran for and won election as a federal deputy to the LXI Legislature of the Mexican Congress, representing the second district of Baja California Sur, including La Paz. He sat on six normal commissions, including three secretarial posts, during his three years in San Lázaro.

In 2015, Castro departed from the PRD and ran as the Morena candidate in the Baja California Sur gubernatorial election of that year, finishing fourth with 6.41 percent of the vote as the state reaffirmed its shift to PAN dominance by re-electing that party in the person of Carlos Mendoza Davis.

In December 2017, Castro announced his intention to seek the Morena nomination for Senate in 2018. On election day, the Juntos Haremos Historia ticket of Castro and Lucía Trasviña Waldenrath placed first, sending both candidates to the Senate. However, on 12 July 2018, president-elect Andrés Manuel López Obrador announced that Castro would be named a state-level coordinator in the new federal government when López Obrador takes office on 1 December; his alternate, Ricardo Velázquez Meza, would serve as senator in his stead.

Governor of Baja California Sur

On 6 June 2021, Castro was elected Governor of Baja California Sur winning between 44.0% to 46.8% of the vote. Castro defeated National Action Party (Mexico) candidate Francisco Pelayo Covarrubias.

References

|-

|-

1955 births
Living people
People from La Paz, Baja California Sur
Politicians from Baja California Sur
Members of the Chamber of Deputies (Mexico) for Baja California Sur
Morena (political party) politicians
Municipal presidents in Baja California Sur
21st-century Mexican politicians
Senators of the LXIV and LXV Legislatures of Mexico
Deputies of the LXI Legislature of Mexico
Members of the Senate of the Republic (Mexico) for Baja California Sur
Governors of Baja California Sur
Mexican Roman Catholics